Stefania Anatolyevna Zaranek (23 September 190417 January 1972) was a Soviet composer, pianist, and artistic director.

Zaranek was born in Kotelnich, Russian Empire, and studied at the Leningrad Conservatory with M. Steinberg and Samariy Savshinsky. After graduating in 1926, she taught piano at the Conservatory and the Worker's High School. From 1942 to 1944 she was the artistic director of the Gorky Philharmonia.

Her compositions include:

Ballet 
 Chudesnaya Fata (1947)
 Golub Mira (1951)
 Mechta (1947)

Film 
 Kholmogorsk
 Mars

Operetta 
 Chest Mundira (E. Pavlov; 1937)
 Schastlivui Put (E. Pavlov; 1939)
 Taina Morya (1954)
 Zolotoi Fontan (K. Guzynin and Aleksei Maslennikov; 1949)

Orchestra 
 Ballad of the Ukraine (1954)
 Dance Suite (1935)
 Kartini Duma Pro Ukrainu
 Piano Concerto (1930)

Piano 
 Sonata, Opus 2 (1926)
 Cinq Miniatures, Opus 4

Theatre 
 music for over 20 plays

Vocal 
 Fizkulturnaya (L. Rakovsky; 1934)
 Four Song Dances: Polonaise, Mazurka, Krakoviak, Gopak (M. Shiffman; 1955)
 Iz Dnevnika Shkolnitsy Song Cycle (E. Aplaksina and A. Churkin; 1948)
 Pesnya O Narodnom Kitaye (I. Lukovski; 1950)
 Pesnya O Vietname (I. Lukovski; 1950)
 U Ryazanskikh Prichalov (L. Khaustov; 1950)
 Za mir I Svobady Song Cycle (B. Rayevsky, B. Kezhun and B. Khanchev; 1950)

References

1904 births
1972 deaths
Russian composers
People from Kirov Oblast
Russian women composers
Women film score composers